Zingel is a genus of fish in the family Percidae. They are long and slender, reaching 12 to 48 cm in length. They are found in rivers and streams in Europe. They feed mainly on aquatic invertebrates such as crustaceans and insect larvae, and also eat small fish. While they were all classed as endangered or vulnerable in the past, environmental improvements have allowed some to be reclassified to least concern.

Species
The genus contains these species:
Zingel asper  (Linnaeus, 1758) (Rhone streber)
Zingel balcanicus (S. L. Karaman, 1937) (Vardar streber)
Zingel streber (Siebold, 1863) (Danube streber)
Zingel zingel  (Linnaeus, 1766) (Zingel)

References

 
Luciopercinae
Taxa named by Hippolyte Cloquet
Taxonomy articles created by Polbot